Jack Lawson is a fictional character from Australia's police series, Blue Heelers. He came into the show in 1999 and was taken off in 2001, his character arrested for murder.

Character's role
Jack arrived in Mount Thomas with his horse Matilda, who appeared frequently on the show. Jack was riding in the bush when he discovered the body of fellow police member Constable Greg Mason. Jack was 19 when he first arrived in Mount Thomas and was still completing his policing degree.

Jack left his girlfriend Molly behind in his hometown, the young lovers having promised each other to wait to consummate their relationship until marriage. But when she visited him in Mount Thomas, she revealed having had an affair with Jack's cousin, and he broke off their relationship. In episode 250, "Under Fire", Molly was impaled during a bus accident. After her death, Jack admitted that he had lied to her about his feelings.

During his time on the show, Jack was on the Mount Thomas footy team, the Mudlarks. One of his detailed story lines involves his friendship with teammates Matty and Scotty. Matty was diagnosed with terminal brain cancer, and Scotty went to jail for manslaughter of another teammate. Matty married his girlfriend Lettie, who gave birth to his son, Matty Jr, before he died. Jack eventually fell in love with Lettie. He lost his virginity to her and moved into her house. The relationship fell apart when Scotty was released from prison, and Lettie realised she was in love with him 'in a different way'.

Jack was shot by a 'mate' after about a year in Mount Thomas, when he tried to get his friend to turn himself in over a drug deal. The bullet lodged too close to his spinal cord to operate, leaving Jack in a wheelchair for some months. Jack was very depressed during this time and sold his horse Matilda to a passing rodeo. After a suspect in a wheelchair was convicted of burglary, and Inspector Falcon-Price ordered Jack to be put on restricted duties at St. Davids, Jack convinced his specialist to operate, despite being given only a 5% chance of success. At the beginning of season 8 it’s revealed that the operation was a success, and Jack was able to walk again.

The shooting left Jack with a lot of resentment towards people who dealt with drugs. He let an innocent man fall to his death. Lawson is best remembered as a kind hearted copper; however, his tendency to constantly overheat soon became his downfall. He is the 12th-longest serving character behind Tom Croydon, Chris Riley, P.J. Hasham, Maggie Doyle, Ben Stewart, Nick Schultz, Jo Parrish, Evan Jones, Adam Cooper and Dash McKinley

Blue Heelers characters
Fictional Australian police officers
Fictional murderers
Television characters introduced in 1999